The Navajo-Churro, or Churro  for short, (also American or Navajo Four-Horned) is a breed of domestic sheep originating with the Spanish Churra sheep obtained by Navajo, Hopi and other Native American nations around the 16th century during the Spanish Conquest. The breed is renowned for its hardiness and adaptability to extremes of climate. Its wool consists of a protective topcoat and soft undercoat.  Some rams have four fully developed horns, a trait shared with few other breeds in the world. The Navajo-Churro has also gained popularity for its low-maintenance reputation, resistance to disease, and lean meat. Some say they are very personable. Ewes often birth twins.  This breed is raised primarily for wool.

History
The Churra (renamed Churro by American frontiersmen) was first imported to North America in the 16th century and used to feed Spanish armies and settlers.  By the 17th century Churros were popular with the Spanish settlers in the upper Rio Grande Valley.  Flocks of Churros were also acquired by the Navajo through trading.  The Churro soon became an important part of the Navajo economy and culture.

A series of United States government-sponsored flock reductions and cross-breedings decimated the Navajo flocks until the Churro sheep nearly disappeared.  Restoration of the breed began in the 1970s when breeders began acquiring Churro phenotypes with the purpose of preserving the breed and revitalizing Navajo and Hispanic flocks.

While the Navajo-Churro breed is no longer in danger of extinction, it is still considered a rare breed.

Horns
The Navajo-Churro breed rams can have two, four, six, or more horns.  This is because they possess the polycerate gene, which is also found in old heritage breeds like the Jacob Sheep. They also have the ability to have fused horns. Ewes also can have horns, or nubs called scurs. The color can be black, white, or striped. The growth of rams’ horns is slow. A full rack takes at least four to five years to grow out. A ewe's horns can also grow large, but not to the extent of the rams. The horns often curl around to the front, and should be away, and not close to the face. The horn quality is essential to getting good genetics in a flock; bad horns in the sire will continue down through his offspring. Horns can break, and as they are living at the base, they will bleed.

Color

Churros come in a variety of colors, including reds, browns, black, white, and mixes, and color may change with age. The color is separated into fleece color, and the points color (legs and head). The sheep may also have different color patterns, such as eye patches and hip spots.

Fleece
The Navajo-Churros possess a dual coat, which has an inner and an outer layer. The fleece is composed of an inner coat (80% of fleece), and outer coat that is hair fibers (10-20% of fleece) and kemp (a coarse, opaque fiber, less than 5% of fleece).

The fleece color is separated from the points color. The fleece can often change from lamb to adulthood. Blacks, for instance, often white out with age.

The Navajo people have used Churro fleece in rugs and other weavings for some time. The wide range of natural colors makes it easy to have a variety of colors without the need for dyeing, although natural vegetable dyes are sometimes used to produce deeper colors and wider selection.

Listings
Navajo-Churros are listed by The Livestock Conservancy as threatened and are part of the Slow Food Ark of heritage foods.

References

Further reading

External links

 Navajo-Churro Sheep Association
  The Navajo Sheep Project
  Diné be' iiná, Inc., a nonprofit organization (The Navajo Lifeway)
  The Livestock Conservancy - Navajo-Churro Sheep

Navajo culture
Sheep breeds originating from Indigenous Americans
Sheep breeds originating in the United States
Indigenous peoples of the Americas articles needing attention